The National Anthem of the Kyrgyz Republic is the title of the current national anthem of Kyrgyzstan, adopted on 18 December 1992 by a resolution of the Supreme Council of Kyrgyzstan (known as the "Jogorku Kenesh").

Initially, the anthem consisted of three verses and a chorus; however, by the resolution of the Jogorku Kenesh of the Kyrgyz Republic N 2648-V of 27 December 2012, the second verse was excluded.

History 
Written by Jalil Sadykov and Shabdanbek Kuluyev and composed by Nasyr Davlesov and Kalyy Moldobasanov, the anthem was adopted on 18 December 1992 by a resolution of the Jogorku Kenesh.

In the 2000s, several public figures began initiatives to change the lyrics of the anthem. They considered the meaning of the word бейкуттук (beyquttuq, "serenity", "calmness"), which was in the second verse, to be contradictory, with the negative prefix бей- (bey-) giving the word кут (kut, "happiness", "luck", "grace") the opposite meaning.

In 2011, the Jogorku Kenesh set up a commission to change the lyrics of the national anthem and the flag, which had also been under dispute over the use of red and the flaming sun. The flag would not be changed, but after considering many proposals for changes to the lyrics or a new second verse, the commission, headed by Abdyrakhman Mamataliev, concluded to remove the verse entirely, stating there were generally contradictions in it. The Jogorku Kenesh voted in favour of the commission's proposal on 27 December 2012 with resolution N 2648-V.

Lyrics

Current lyrics

Lyrics from 1992 to 2012 

The anthem with the additional verse between verses one and two (official until 27 December 2012):

Anthem protocol

When the anthem is being performed at official ceremonies and social functions, the protocol is to put the hands over their heart if one is a civilian, which follows the American example for the playing of "The Star-Spangled Banner". When in formation, officers of the Armed Forces of Kyrgyzstan perform a Russian-style salute while enlisted personnel present arms with whatever weapon they might have in hand, outside of formation, all personnel salute.

See also
Anthem of the Kirghiz Soviet Socialist Republic, the previous anthem

Notes

References

External links
Audio of the national anthem of Kyrgyzstan, with information and lyrics
Himnuszok - A vocal recording of the anthem hosted on Szbszig's Himnuszok website
Version of the national anthem on the audio page of the President of Kyrgyzstan
National anthem of Kyrgyzstan from official website of President of Kyrgyz Republic
State Symbols of Kyrgyzstan

Kyrgyzstani music
National symbols of Kyrgyzstan
Kyrgyzstan
Kyrgyz anthems
National anthem compositions in A major